The Austrian Decoration for Science and Art is a state decoration of the Republic of Austria and forms part of the Austrian national honours system.

History 
The "Austrian Decoration for Science and Art" was established by the National Council as an honour for scientific or artistic achievements by Federal Law of May 1955 (Federal Law Gazette No. 96/1955 as amended BGBl I No 128/2001). At the same time, the National Council also established the "Austrian Cross of Honour for Science and Art", which is awarded as "Cross of Honour, First Class" (German: Ehrenkreuz 1. Klasse) and "Cross of Honour" (German: Ehrenkreuz). While not technically counted as lower classes of the Decoration for Science and Art, these crosses are nevertheless affiliated with it.

Divisions

Decoration for Science and Art 
The number of living recipients of the Decoration for Science and Art is limited to a maximum of 72 at any one time (36 recipients for science and 36 for arts). In each of these two groups there are 18 Austrian citizens and 18 foreign nationals.

Cross of Honour for Science and Art, First Class 
There are no limits on the number of recipients.

Cross of Honour for Science and Art
There are no limits on the number of recipients.

Precedence

Recipients

Decoration for Science and Art 
1957: Clemens Holzmeister, architect
1959: Max Mell, writer
1960: O. W. Fischer, actor
1961: Herbert von Karajan, conductor; Rudolf von Laun, international lawyer
1964: Edmund Hlawka, mathematician; Ernst Lothar, writer and director
1966: Ludwig von Ficker, writer and publisher
1967: Karl Heinrich Waggerl, writer; Lise Meitner, physicist
1969: Anny Felbermayer, soprano
1971: Fritz Wotruba, architect and artist
1972: Elias Canetti, writer
1974: Gottfried von Einem, composer
1974: Paul Hörbiger, actor
1975: Hans Tuppy, biochemist; Robert Stolz, composer
1976: Friedrich Torberg, writer and translator; Manfred Eigen, chemist
1977: Ernst Schönwiese, writer
1978: Hans Nowotny, chemist
1979: Roland Rainer, architect; Max Weiler, artist
1980: Alfred Uhl and Marcel Rubin, composer; Fritz Hochwälder, writer; Karl Popper, philosopher and science theorist
1981: Gertrud Fussenegger, writer; Werner Berg, painter
1982: Heinrich Harrer, mountaineer; Jacqueline de Romilly, philologist
1983: Hans Plank, painter
1985: Erika Mitterer, writer
1986: Johann Jascha, artist
1987: Friederike Mayröcker, writer
1988: Dietmar Grieser, author and journalist
1990: Ernst Jandl, writer; Hans Hollein, architect
1991: H.C. Artmann, writer
1992: Carlos Kleiber, conductor; Krzysztof Penderecki, composer
1993: Margarete Schütte-Lihotzky, architect; Peter Schuster, chemist; Gottfried Biegelmeier, physicist; Walter Thirring, physicist; Albert Eschenmoser, chemist; Albrecht Schöne, philologist; Günther Wilke, chemist
1994: Josef Mikl, painter; Erwin Chargaff, chemist
1995: Horst Stein, conductor
1996: Siegfried Josef Bauer, meteorologist and geophysicist
1997: Bruno Gironcoli, artist; Kurt Schwertsik, composer; Hans Hass, biologist; Robert Walter, jurist; Albrecht Dihle, classical philologist; Cassos Karageorghis, archaeologist; Klemens von Klemperer, historian
1998: Hans-Jörg Wiedl reptile expert Helmut Denk, pathologist
1999: Carl Pruscha, architect; Elisabeth Lichtenberger, geographer; Karl Acham, sociologist; Walter Kohn, physicist
2000: Paul Kirchhof, constitutional and tax lawyer; Hans Müllejans, provost; Herwig Wolfram, historian; Gerardo Broggini, lawyer
2001: Anton Zeilinger, experimental physicist
2002: Arik Brauer, painter, poet and singer; Peter Wolf, Austrian-born producer and composer; Eugen Biser, religious philosopher; Horst Dreier, legal philosopher; Elliott H. Lieb, physicist and mathematician; Bogdan Bogdanović, architect
2003: Hermann Fillitz, art historian; Wolfgang M. Schmidt, mathematician
2004: Klaus Wolff, dermatologist
2005: Václav Havel, writer, dissident and former president of the Czech Republic; Christian Attersee, painter; Eric Kandel, neuroscientist; Peter Palese, virologist
2006: Bruno Ganz, actor; Stephen Toulmin, philosopher; Christian Meier, historian; Pierre Soulages, painter; Michael Mitterauer, historian
2007: Otto Tausig, actor
2008: Marina Abramović, performance artist 
2009: Mati Sirkel, translator
2010: Paul Holdengräber, curator
2012: Christoph Waltz, actor, director.
2013: Gerhard Rühm, author, composer, artist
2014: Abbas Kiarostami, film director, screenwriter, photographer

Cross (and Cross 1st Class) 

1960: Karl Schiske, composer
1961: Günther Baszel, artist; Ernst Lothar, author and director
1965: Kurt Roger, Composer / Professor Georg Szell Conductor Nathan Milstein Violin
1967: Maria Augusta von Trapp, matriarch of the Trapp Family Singers
1968: Alphons Barb, author
1970: Enver Čolaković, writer and poet
1971: Gustav Zelibor, pianist and conductor
1974: Erika Mitterer, writer; Marcel Rubin, composer; Arthur Hilton, chemist,
1975  Karl Menger, mathematician
1976: Wolfgang Mayer König, writer
1977: Wolfgang Rehm, musicologist
1978: Kurt Neumüller, pianist and pedagogue
1980: Alfred Uhl, composer
1981: Thomas Christian David, conductor, composer, flutist
1982: Margareta Sjöstedt

1983: Walter Bitterlich, forest scientist, Wolf Häfele, physicist
1984: Frank Sinatra, singer and actor, Fritz Muliar, actor and director, Ludwig Schwarzer, painter
1987: Alois Hergouth, writer and poet; Helen Adolf, literature scholar and linguist
1989: Norbert Pawlicki, pianist and composer
1994: Christian M. Nebehay, art dealer and author
1996: Ronald S. Calinger, American historian of Mathematics; Fausto Cercignani, Italian scholar, essayist and poet; Quirino Principe, Italian philosopher of music and dramatist
1997: Herbert Willi, composer; Lucian O. Meysels, author; Ernest Manheim, American sociologist of Hungarian origin
1998: Senta Berger, actress, Kiki Kogelnik, artist (posthumously awarded), Edith Neumann, microbiologist.
1999: Peter Simonischek, actor, Erich Gruen, historian.
2001: Klaus-Peter Sattler, composer, Hermann Maurer, computer scientist, Walter Homolka, rabbi; Hannspeter Winter, physicist; Johann Grander, inventor.
2002: Fabio Luisi, Italian conductor, Kurt Rudolf Fischer, philosopher, Wolfdietrich Schmied-Kowarzik, philosopher; John Ross, chemist; Seiji Ozawa, conductor
2003: Erich Schleyer, actor and author, Günther Granser, economist
2004: Oswald Oberhuber, artist, Hans Winter, veterinary pathologist
2005: Gottfried Kumpf, painter, architect, sculptor, Georg Ratzinger, choirmaster, Heinz Zemanek, computer pioneer
2006: Peter Ruzicka, German composer and artistic director, Lothar Bruckmeier, painter, Peter Wegner, computer scientist, Elisabeth Leonskaja, Russian pianist, Richard Kriesche, artist
2007: Herbert W. Franke, scientist, writer, artist; Hans Walter Lack, botanist; Josef Burg, writer; Reginald Vospernik, high school director; Nuria Nono-Schönberg, Lawrence Schönberg, Ronald Schönberg, the three children of Arnold Schoenberg
2008: Gerhard Haszprunar, zoologist; Ernst von Glasersfeld, Austro-American constructivist, Michael Ludwig, Michael Kaufmann, manager of German culture; Reinhard Putz, anatomist; Jessye Norman, American soprano; Hannes Androsch, Finance Minister and Vice Chancellor a.D.; Gerald Holton, physicist and historian of science
2008: Arvo Pärt, Estonian composer
2009: Grita Insam, gallerist; Hans Werner Scheidl, journalist and author; Stefan Größing, sports scientist; Bruno Mamoli, specialist in neurology and psychiatry, Fredmund Malik, management scientist Theodore Bikel
2010: Boris Pahor, Slovenian writer
2011: Harry Schachter, Canadian Biochemist
2012: Hilde Hawlicek, Austrian former government minister
2012: Ronny Reich, Israeli Archaeologist
2013: Uroš Lajovic, Slovenian conductor
2015: Jan M. Ziolkowski, American medievalist and Latinist
2015: Richard Gisser, demographer
2017: Julius Rebek Jr., American chemist;  Michael Schratz, educational scientist
2019: , Dutch historian
2021: Jesús Padilla Gálvez, Spanish philosopher
2021: August Reinisch, Austrian lawyer

Forfeiture 
Forfeiture of this honour became possible with Federal Law Gazette I No 128/2001, changing Act § 8a. It allows the government to strip recipients of their honours if deemed unworthy. The best known example of such a forfeiture is of the Nazi physician Heinrich Gross.

On 5 August 2008 the Austrian Science Minister Johannes Hahn decided not to withdraw the award from inventor Johann Grander. – see also Wikipedia German version and see also Austrian ministry

References

External links 
www.kurienwissenschaftundkunst.at 
Decoration of Honour, Federal President of the Republic of Austria
Photos of the Medal
Federal Law Gazette, 22 June 1955: Federal Law of 25 May 1955 on the creation of the Austrian Medal for Science and the Arts and the Austrian Honorary Cross for Science and the Arts (pdf, 647kb)
Federal Law Gazette, November 2001: Amendment to the Federal Law on the establishment of an Austrian Medal for Science and the Arts and the Austrian Honorary Cross for Science and the Arts. (pdf, 5kb)

Orders, decorations, and medals of Austria
Lists of Austrian people
1955 establishments in Austria
Awards established in 1955